The India national rugby league team represents India in international rugby league football competitions.
They made their international debut against Colombia in Brisbane, Australia on July 14, 2019.

Results
Note: The winning team is given first.
India 30–16 Colombia

India vs Latin Heat - Blacktown, Sydney 26.10.2019
Result: India 30–26 Latin Heat

Current squad
Inaugural squad vs Colombia - July 14;
1.Shaniyat Chowdhury 
2.Josh Naidu 
3.Matt Anirudh 
4.Sukhpal Malhi 
18.Joseph Kumar 
6.Jassy Bhullar 
7.Michael Sharma 
8.Shanil Kumar 
9.Amoi Singh 
10.Nitesh Kumar 
11.Vikram Atwal 
12.Eshaan Shankaar 
13.Nick Samra 
Substitutes
14.Shamal Gounder
15.Asif Khan
16.Ravi Singh
17.Amandip Sharma
5.Afsheen Ali (did not play)

India Jungle Cats VS Latin Heat - October 26, 2019
1 Michael Sharma 
2 Matt Anirudh 
3 Michael Bhatty 
4 Sukhpal Malhi 
5 Joshua Naidu 
6 Aman Singh 
7 Jassy Bhullar (VC) 
8 Nick Samra 
9 Amoi Singh 
10 Shamal Gounder 
11 Eshaan Shankar 
12 Amith Kumar 
13 Vikram Atwal (C) 
Substitutes
14 Amandip Sharma Utility
15 Ravi Singh 
16 Faraz Khan 
17 Shane Magee 
18 Afsheen Ali Utility

References

External links
Rugby League International Federation

See also

National rugby league teams
Rugby league
Rugby league in Asia